Skandawa  is a village in northern Poland, in the administrative district of Gmina Barciany, Kętrzyn County, and the Warmian-Masurian Voivodeship.

It is located close to the border with the Kaliningrad Oblast of Russia.

The 390-km-long Line 353 of Polish State Railways (PKP) connects Poznań to Skandawa and the Russian border (8 km north-east of Skandawa and 3 km south-west of Zheleznodorozhny) via Olsztyn and Korsze. Since 2000 the final stretch from Korsze to the border has been a freight-only branch, and the railway station at Korsze (15 km to the south-west) is today Skandawa's nearest passenger facility.

References

Villages in Kętrzyn County